Vecvārkava is a village in Upmala Parish, Preiļi Municipality in the Latgale region of Latvia.

Towns and villages in Latvia
Preiļi Municipality
Dvinsky Uyezd
Latgale